Poa remota is a species of grass in the family Poaceae.

Its native range is Europe to China and Caucasus.

References

remota